The 1990 Michigan Secretary of State election was held on November 6, 1990. Incumbent Democrat Richard H. Austin defeated Republican nominee Judy Miller with 60.63% of the vote.

General election

Candidates
Major party candidates
Richard H. Austin, Democratic
Judy Miller, Republican

Results

References

1990 Michigan elections
Michigan Secretary of State elections
Michigan
November 1990 events in the United States